"Hello L.O.V.E." is a song written by Jeffrey Steele and Danny Wells, and recorded by American country music artist John Michael Montgomery.  It was released in March 1999 as the first single from his album Home to You. The song reached No. 15 on the Billboard Hot Country Singles & Tracks chart in June 1999.

Music video
The music video was directed by Jim Shea and premiered in April 1999.

Chart performance

Year-end charts

References

1999 singles
John Michael Montgomery songs
Songs written by Jeffrey Steele
Song recordings produced by Garth Fundis
Atlantic Records singles
Songs written by Danny Wells (songwriter)
1999 songs